Adrien Mattenet (born 15 October 1987) is a French table tennis player, currently playing for AS Pontoise-Cergy TT. His World Ranking is at number 19 as of December 2011, the best ranking for a French player since Christophe Legout in 2001.

In May 2011, Mattenet was the first Frenchman to qualify for the London 2012 Olympic Games by beating Singapore's Gao Ning to reach the Quarterfinals of the 2011 World Championships. At the 2012 Olympics, he lost to Chen Weixing in the fourth round.  In June 2015, he competed in the inaugural European Games, for France in table tennis, more specifically, Men's team with Simon Gauzy and Emmanuel Lebesson. He earned a silver medal.

See also
 List of table tennis players

References

External links
 
 
 
 
 

1987 births
Living people
French male table tennis players
Olympic table tennis players of France
Table tennis players at the 2012 Summer Olympics
European Games silver medalists for France
Table tennis players at the 2015 European Games
Mediterranean Games gold medalists for France
Competitors at the 2009 Mediterranean Games
Universiade medalists in table tennis
Mediterranean Games medalists in table tennis
Universiade silver medalists for France
Universiade bronze medalists for France
European Games medalists in table tennis
Medalists at the 2009 Summer Universiade
Medalists at the 2011 Summer Universiade
Sportspeople from Val-d'Oise
21st-century French people